Afua Kyei is a Ghanaian financial executive and has been the Chief Financial Officer (CFO) of the Bank of England since 2019. She was formally the Finance Director at Barclays Bank LLC. In January 2023, Kyei was listed among the 100 most reputable Africans.

Education 
Kyei earned her bachelor's and master's degrees from Oxford University.

References 

Living people
21st-century Ghanaian women
Alumni of the University of Oxford
Year of birth missing (living people)